The Congregation of the Mission abbreviated CM and commonly called the Vincentians or Lazarists. is a Roman Catholic society of apostolic life of Pontifical Right for men founded by Vincent de Paul. It is associated with the Vincentian Family, a loose federation of organizations who look to St Vincent de Paul as their founder or Patron.

History

The Congregation has its origin in the successful mission to the common people conducted by Vincent de Paul and five other priests on the estates of the Gondi family. More immediately it dates from 1624, when the little community acquired a permanent settlement in the Collège des Bons Enfants in Paris, which later became a seminary under the name of St. Firmin. The first missions of the Vincentians were in the suburbs of Paris and in Picardy and Champagne. 
Archiepiscopal recognition was obtained in 1626. By a papal bull on January 12, 1633, the society was constituted a congregation, with Vincent de Paul as its head. About the same time the canons regular of St. Victor handed over to the congregation their priory of Saint Lazare (formerly a lazar-house or leper hospital) in Paris, which led to its members being popularly known as 'Lazarists.

Within a few years the Vincentians had acquired another house in Paris and set up other establishments throughout France; missions were also sent to Italy (1638), Tunis (1643), Algiers and Ireland (1646), Madagascar (1648), Poland (1651), and Turkey (1783). A bull of Alexander VII in April 1655 further confirmed the society; this was followed by a brief in September of the same year, regulating its constitution. The rules then adopted, which were framed on the model of those of the Jesuits, were published at Paris in 1668 under the title Regulae seu constitutiones communes congregationis missionis. Its special aims were the religious instruction of the poor, the training of the clergy, and foreign missions.

On the eve of the French Revolution, Saint Lazare was plundered by the mob and the congregation was later suppressed; it was restored by Napoleon in 1804 at the desire of Pius VII, abolished by him in 1809 in consequence of a quarrel with the pope, and again restored in 1816. The Vincentians were expelled from Italy in 1871 and from Germany in 1873.

The Vincentian province of Poland was singularly prosperous; at the date of its suppression in 1796 it possessed thirty-five establishments. The Congregation of the Mission was permitted to return in 1816, where it is very active. In Madagascar it had a mission from 1648 until 1674. In 1783 Vincentians were appointed to take the place of the Jesuits in the Levantine and Chinese missions; and in 1874 their establishments throughout the Ottoman Empire numbered sixteen. In addition, they established missions in Persia, Abyssinia, Mexico, the South American republics, Portugal, Spain, and Russia, some of which were later suppressed. In the same year they had fourteen establishments in the United States of America.

Present day
As of 2021, the Vincentians number about 3,100 worldwide, with a presence in 95 different countries. Its specific apostolate remains the evangelization of the poor and the formation of the clergy. , Tomaž Mavrič is the incumbent worldwide superior general of the Congregation of the Mission, elected during its general assembly on July 5, 2016.

Opus Prize Finalist
On August 30, 2007, The Catholic University of America, (with the Opus Prize 2004 Foundation, affiliated with The Opus Group), announced that it would award on November 8 a $1-million and two $100,000 Humanity prizes to finalist organizations which contributed to solve most persistent social problems: John Adams (of So Others Might Eat'' which serves the poor and homeless in Washington, DC); Stan Goetschalckx (founder and director of AHADI International Institute in Tanzania which educates refugees from Congo, Rwanda, and Burundi); and Bebot Carcellar of the Vincentian Missionaries Social Development Foundation. On November 8, 2007, David M. O'Connell, president of Catholic University, personally bestowed these Opus Prizes at the university's Edward J. Pryzbyla University Center.

Philippines
In 2008 the Vincentian family marked 150 years in the Philippines, led by the provincial Bienvenido M. Disu, Gregorio L. Bañaga, President of Adamson University, and Archbishop Jesus Dosado of the Archdiocese of Ozamiz. The Philippine province has a deacon, 5 incorporated brothers, and 97 priests. A major work is the housing program for hundreds of families, especially those affected by demolitions and relocations along the Philippine North and South Railways tracks.

The CBCP Newsletter announced on July 10, 2008, the appointment of the Philippine Marcelo Manimtim as director of Paris-based Centre International de Formation. Manimtim is the first Asian to hold the office.

Housing programs
In 1991, Carcellar was assigned to Payatas. With his "Planning for a new home, Systemic Change Strategy," he organized Philippine massive home constructions, which he began by a savings program at Payatas dumpsite. Carcellar's "The Homeless Peoples Federation Philippines" provided slum dwellers of Iloilo City and Mandaue City with initiatives to survive poverty. In 2008 it promoted savings in Southeast Asia, since the Philippine Federation affiliated with an international network called "Slum/Shack Dwellers International".

Another, younger Vincentian was also assigned by Cardinal Gaudencio Rosales as the Coordinator of the Housing Ministry of the Archdiocese of Manila.

Vincentian Center for Social Responsibility
On September 28, 2007, Philippine Vice President Noli De Castro welcomed the launching of the Vincentian Center for Social Responsibility by the Adamson University. The center intends to engage the Adamson's academic community more deeply and directly in nation-building and to directly respond to Millennium Development Goals' poverty alleviation initiatives in the country. De Castro also cited the Adamson University and a Vincentian priest named Fr. Riles for their efforts in putting up the Vincentian Center.

The Vincentian Center for Social Responsibility is also responsible for the creation of the Vincentian Facilitators, the Academic Social Responsibility, the Academic Social Entrepreneurship, and the Academic Social Journalism at the Vincentian-owned Adamson University. Through the Vincentian Center, the movement towards academic social networking has become a reality in the university. It is also responsible for organizing the First Northville and Southville People's Congress, consisting of around 750,000 relocatees from Metro Manila and the provinces of Cavite, Bulacan and Laguna.

United States of America
The Vincentians travelled to the United States in 1816 and two years later established St. Mary's of the Barrens seminary. They founded Niagara University (1856), St. John's University (1870), and DePaul University (1898).

The Western Province of the USA has a mission in Kenya, where in conjunction with parish ministry water projects have been initiated to provide clean water to the people.

The New England Province was founded in 1904 by Vincentians from Poland. They staff parishes in New York and Connecticut. The Provincial headquarters is in Manchester, Connecticut.

Prominent members of the congregation
Members of the congregation include:
 Thaddeus Amat y Brusi (1810-1878), first bishop of Los Angeles
 E. Bore (died 1878), orientalist
 P. Collet (1693-1770), writer on theology and ethics
 Armand David (1826-1900), Basque missionary and zoologist
 Jean-Claude Faveyrial (1813–1893), French historian and author of the first book on the history of Albania
 Pierre-Marie-Alphonse Favier (1837-1905), missionary to China, and Vicar Apostolic of North Zhili Province (1898-1905)
 Frederic Gehring (1903-1998), missionary to China and decorated chaplain to American forces during the Guadalcanal Campaign
 Joseph Lilly, translator of the Greek New Testament into English in 1946.
 Stéphanos II Ghattas (1920-2009), Patriarch emeritus of Alexandria for the Copts
 J. de la Grive (1689-1757), geographer
 Évariste Régis Huc (1813-1860), missionary and traveller
 Teodorico Pedrini (1671-1746), missionary to China and musician
 Stafford Poole (1936-2020), historian
 John T. Richardson (1923–2022), President of DePaul University
 Franc Rode (1934-), Cardinal and former Prefect of the Congregation for Institutes of Consecrated Life and Societies of Apostolic Life
 Joseph Rosati (1789-1843), first bishop of St. Louis, Missouri
 David M. O'Connell (1955-), Bishop of Trenton
 Joseph Patrick Slattery, (1866-1931) physicist, radiologist, pioneer in the field of radiography in Australia
 Georges Bou-Jaoudé (1943-2022), Archbishop of Tripoli, Lebanon for the Maronites
 Aba Shlimon (aka Pere Desire Solomon, Khwaja Shlimon) late 19th century Urmia, Persia, an Assyrian scholar
 Oscar Lukefahr, theologian, writer, and Christian apologist
 Pedro Opeka, Argentinian missionary in Madagascar
 Bruce Vawter, chairman of religious studies at De Paul University from 1969 until 1986 
Michael Prior, (1942-2004), Irish priest, liberation theologian, outspoken critic of Zionism

Universities
The religious congregation runs the following institutions of higher education:
 Adamson University (Philippines)
 DePaul University (United States)
 Faculdade Vicentina, Curitiba (Brazil)
Institutions formerly run by the Congregation:
 All Hallows College, Dublin (Ireland)
 Irish College in Paris (France), administered by the Vincentians from 1858 until 1939.
 St Patrick's College, Drumcondra, Dublin (Ireland)
 St. Mary's University, Twickenham (United Kingdom)
 University of Dallas (United States)
 St. Vincent's College, forerunner to Loyola Marymount University; the present university is the successor to the first institution of higher learning in Southern California, St. Vincent's College. Vincentian Fathers were commissioned by Bishop Thaddeus Amat y Brusi to found this for boys in Los Angeles.

Secondary schools
The Vincentian fathers also run a number of secondary schools, most notably in Dublin, Ireland, where the order is in charge of two such institutions.
 Castleknock College, Dublin, Ireland
 St. Paul's College, Raheny, Dublin, Ireland
 Colégio São Vicente de Paulo, Rio de Janeiro, Brazil
 St Stanislaus College (Bathurst), New South Wales, Australia
 Österreichisches Sankt Georgs-Kolleg, Istanbul, Turkey
Liceum Ogólnokształcące w Centrum Edukacyjnym „Radosna Nowina 2000”, Piekary, Poland

See also

 Archconfraternity of Holy Agony
 Institute of consecrated life
 Saint Vincent de Paul Chapel in Paris
 Vocational discernment in the Catholic Church

Notes

External links
 Congregation of the Mission official site
 Vincentian Studies Institute
 Further information on the Lazarist Church in Vienna from Marks Travel Notes
 Nightingale Mountain Vincentian Fathers at the French Sacred Heart College in Smyrna (now Izmir) and the House of the Virgin Mary

 
Christian organizations established in the 17th century
1624 establishments in France
Societies of apostolic life
Religious organizations established in 1624